The Ministry of National Defence and Homeland Veterans is an executive agency of the Government of Angola that controls the Angolan Armed Forces. It is based at Rua 17 de Setembro in Luanda.

Name changes
 1975–1995: Ministry of Defence
 1996–present: Ministry of National Defence

Structure 

 Military Affairs Cabinet ("Casa Militar"), headed by one of the three Ministers of State and answers directly to the Office of the President.

Minister of National Defence
The Minister of National Defence of Angola is a cabinet level position in the national government. The minister is responsible for the entire defense establishment. The position was established in 1975 with Henrique Teles Carreira as the inaugural minister.

List 
 1975–1979: Gen. Henrique Teles Carreira
 1980–1995: Gen. Pedro Pedalé
 1995–1999: Gen. Pedro Sebastião
 1999–2010: Gen. Kundi Paihama
 2010–2014: Gen. Cândido Pereira dos Santos Van-Dúnem
 2014–2017: Gen. João Manuel Gonçalves Lourenço
 2017–2020: Gen. Salviano de Jesus Sequeira
2020–present: Gen. João Ernesto dos Santos

Deputies 
The commanders of the three major military services each held the title of vice minister of defense.

References

External links

 http://www.minden.gov.ao/

Defence
Defence Ministers
Politics of Angola
Military of Angola